Warham is a place in the English county of Herefordshire. It is situated about 3 km west of the city of Hereford, close to the north bank of the River Wye. The population of the village at the 2011 census was 193.

References

External links

Villages in Herefordshire